NK Uskok is a Croatian football club based in Klis.

Seasons

References

 
Football clubs in Croatia
Football clubs in Split-Dalmatia County
Association football clubs established in 1930
1930 establishments in Croatia